Anthony Rogers is a Scottish actor known for his role as Sir Dinadan in Camelot (1967).

Biography
Anthony Rogers was born in the Scottish town of Hamilton and attended the Queen Victoria School in Dunblane. Then for six years he was with the British Merchant Marines during which he made a trip to California. After the Marines he moved to Florida and became an instructor in water sports.

Career
He began his acting career in Florida where he joined Hollywood Little Theater. After which he went to New York and trained at HB Studio. When he returned to the UK, he appeared in bit parts in television series such as The Avengers and Doctor Who. In 1965 he moved to California and appeared in the WWII drama Combat! in the fourth season episode "Evasion" as Lt. Maples (1965) (TV). He was later to be seen in Hollywood films such as the Howard Hawks movies Red Line 7000 (1965) and El Dorado (1967), as well as Camelot (1967).

James Bond
In 1967 LIFE Magazine sent photographer Loomis Dean to casting sessions for the James Bond movie, On Her Majesty's Secret Service (1969). In 11 October 1968 edition of the magazine Rogers was shown to be one of five candidates (the others being George Lazenby, John Richardson, Hans De Vries and Robert Campbell) auditioning for the role of James Bond, eventually losing out to Lazenby.

References

External links

People educated at Queen Victoria School, Dunblane
English male film actors
American male film actors
Living people
Year of birth missing (living people)
People from Hamilton, South Lanarkshire